Cadwell may refer to:

People
 Albert Cadwell (1900–1944), English footballer
 Angela Cadwell, retired United States Air Force major general
 Arthur A. Cadwell (1882–1937), American cinematographer
 Charles Cadwell, American professor
 George Cadwell (1773–1826), American politician
 Jane Cadwell (1915–2000), American swimmer 
 Linda Lee Cadwell (born 1945), widow of Bruce Lee
 Luman L. Cadwell (1836–1925), American soldier
 Sidney M. Cadwell (1893–1986), discoverer of anti-oxidants for rubber

Places
 Cadwell Park, motor racing circuit in Lincolnshire, England
 Cadwell, Georgia
 Cadwell, Hertfordshire, England

See also
 Caldwell (disambiguation)
 Kadwell, surname